The Criminal Investigation Department (CID) was a branch of the British colonial Palestine Police Force in Mandatory Palestine.

The CID was originally in charge of forensic investigations but after the 1929 Palestine riots, the CID was placed in charge of "collect[ing] detailed information on Arabs and Jews—including through informers—produced political analyses and estimates, and supported security operations." After the 1936–1939 Arab revolt in Palestine, the CID focused more on the Jewish insurgency against British rule in Palestine. According to the research of Eldad Harouvi in Palestine Investigated: The Criminal Investigation Department of the Palestine Police Force, 1920–1948, the CID ultimately "evolved from an organization investigating crime to one designed to protect British rule and keep Jews and Arabs from each other's throats."

References

Law enforcement in Mandatory Palestine
Criminal investigation